Events in the year 1622 in Norway.

Incumbents
Monarch: Christian IV

Events
The town of Grimstad was founded.

Arts and literature

Births

16 December – Cort Adeler, naval officer, admiral (died 1675).

Deaths

See also

References